Igor Francetić (born 21 April 1977 in Zagreb) is a Croatian rower who won a bronze medal in the eights competition at the 2000 Summer Olympics in Sydney. His teammates were Igor Boraska, Nikša Skelin, Siniša Skelin, Branimir Vujević, Krešimir Čuljak, Tomislav Smoljanović and Tihomir Franković.

References
databaseOlympic.com
 sports-reference

1977 births
Living people
Croatian male rowers
Rowers at the 2000 Summer Olympics
Olympic rowers of Croatia
Olympic bronze medalists for Croatia
Sportspeople from Zagreb
Olympic medalists in rowing

Medalists at the 2000 Summer Olympics